A notice of electronic filing (NEF) is part of the system established by the Administrative Office of the United States Courts through the docketing and access systems of PACER & CM/ECF. PACER is a public-access system accessible by any person after registration and for a fee.  CM/ECF is the Case Management/Electronic Court Filing system, available only to those admitted to a particular U.S. District or U.S. Court of Appeals. The NEF provides a record of service of an electronically filed document by parties, or of service of the electronically filed orders and judgments of the courts, upon attorneys in the case and the court. For such parties, the NEF has replaced the traditional service via US Mail or other "paper" methods. (Figures 1, 2)

Sources of information
The central source for information regarding NEFs remains in CM/ECF manuals.

For example, the most explicit definition of the power and effect of NEF in the Central District of California, one of the most populous in the U.S., including Los Angeles County, remained in the "Unofficial Manual" of CM/ECF as follows (Rev 07, 2008, page 13):

A more specific definition is found in the United States District Court for the Western District of Texas Administrative Policies and Procedures for Electronic Filing.

The General Order 08-02 of the US District Court, Central District of California provided additional information, pertaining to the significance of the "electronic document stamp" in the process of entry:

Although such information is derived from disparate US courts, it can be assumed to be universally applicable, since the basic platforms of PACER and CM/ECF were universally implemented in all US courts.  However, significant variations are found in the manner in which the NEFs are employed. (Figures 2,3,4)

Significance
As documented, above, in the texts from the US District Courts in California and Texas, the NEF today serves as the form of authentication by the Clerk and counsel of the entry of records, in same way as the traditional Certificate of Service.

The CM/ECF system includes a Document Verification Utility, which permits the user to enter the case number and document number.  The Utility, available to counsel on the case and the court, then compares the current version of the document with the NEF's Electronic Document Stamp and verifies that the document, as it appears on the docket, was not altered. (Figures 5,6).

Criticism
The Notice of Electronic Filing has come under some criticism for not being a public document and therefore not available to non-participants in the related case(s). This has led some pro-se litigants and others to misinterpret what an NEF is and its significance.

See also 
 Electronic court filing
 CM/ECF

References

Legal documents
Federal judiciary of the United States